David Horton may refer to:

David Horton, a fictional character in  The Vicar of Dibley  sitcom
David Horton (writer) (born 1945), editor of The Encyclopaedia of Aboriginal Australia (1994)
David Horton (badminton), English champion badminton player
David Horton Wilkins, American attorney and former U. S. Ambassador to Canada